Boys' School is a 1938 French drama film by Christian-Jaque based on the novel of the same title by Pierre Véry. It has become a cult film.

Plot
Shortly before the war, strange things happen at night at the School of Saint-Agil. Students begin to disappear... Three students of Saint-Agil, Beaume Sorgue and Macroy, have created a secret society to prepare leaving for America. One evening, one of them, Sorgue, sees a man through a wall in the natural sciences class. He then disappears after having been sent to the principal's office. When Macroy vanishes in turn, the whole institution is in turmoil. The last member of the secret society still at school, Beaume, might be expelled as well after the yearly school party. During this party, Lemel, the alcoholic art teacher, dies after a fall when a power outage leaves the school in the black. Everyone believes in an accident but Beaume decides to investigate. He chooses to disappear as well and, with the help of the mysterious and spooky English teacher, he manages to discover the counterfeiting business at work in the school insides.

Cast
 Marcel Mouloudji as Philippe Macroy
 Jean Claudio as Mathieu Sorgue
 Erich von Stroheim as Walter, the English teacher
 Michel Simon as Lemel, the art teacher
 Robert Le Vigan as César, the counterfeiter
 Armand Bernard as Mazeau, the concierge
 Aimé Clariond as the school principal
 René Génin as Donnadieu, the music teacher
 Serge Reggiani as a schoolboy [uncredited]
 Charles Aznavour as a schoolboy [uncredited]
 Robert Rollis as a schoolboy
 Serge Grave as Beaume
 Jacques Derives as Planet
 Martial Rèbe as the dorm supervisor
 Pierre Labry as Bernardin
 Albert Malbert as Alexis, the miller
 Félix Claude as a schoolboy
 Jean Buquet as the snitch
 Claude Roy as the schoolboy with a turtle
 Robert Ozanne as a nurse

References

External links
 

1938 drama films
1938 films
French black-and-white films
Films directed by Christian-Jaque
Films set in France
Films based on works by Pierre Véry
Films set in boarding schools
Columbia Pictures films
French drama films
1930s French films
1930s French-language films